Camilla Eve Brady (born 24 December 1993) is an English actress and model. She is best known for portraying Æthelflæd in the
medieval drama The Last Kingdom (2017–2022) as well as her role in the film Pride and Prejudice and Zombies (2016).

Early life
Brady was born in Bracknell, Berkshire and moved around the country as a child. She went to boarding school at St Mary's School Ascot from the ages of 11 to 18. Interested in acting from a young age, she did some modeling as a teenager to save money to move to London.

Career
Brady made her television debut in the second series of the ITV series Mr Selfridge and her film debut as Joan Collins in Legend. She then signed with Premier Model Management, walking her first runway and landing a brand campaign with Miu Miu. She played Mary Bennet in the 2016 comedy horror film Pride and Prejudice and Zombies. In 2015, she was set to star in a TV adaptation of the novel The Clan of the Cave Bear; however, Lifetime cancelled the series before it ever went into production.

In 2017, Brady joined the main cast of The Last Kingdom for its second series as Lady Æthelflæd. She had film roles in King Arthur: Legend of the Sword (2017), Teen Spirit (2018), and Intrigo: Samaria (2019). In 2020, she starred in two miniseries: White House Farm on ITV as Sally Jones and Roadkill on BBC One as Lily Laurence. She also had a minor role in The Queen's Gambit on Netflix.

In June 2021, it was announced Brady would appear in the Apple TV+ miniseries Surface, which premiered 29 July 2022. Brady made her Off West End debut in February 2022 appearing in an English-language translation of the play The Forest by Florian Zeller at the Hampstead Theatre, directed by Jonathan Kent.

In April 2022, Brady was cast in the horror-thriller film Double Blind alongside Pollyanna McIntosh. In August 2022 it was announced that Brady would star as the lead in the Filip Jan Rymza-directed feature film Object Permanence, playing "Brooke Brooks, a former supermodel who becomes a highly successful lifestyle mogul and the first person to IPO (Initial Public Offering) herself." Filming is set to begin September 2022 in Poland, Germany and Thailand.

Personal life
Brady resides in Hampstead in North London with her older sister Caroline. She has a dog named Luna. Though she prefers to keep her dating life private, it became public knowledge that Millie and the One Direction singer Harry Styles dated briefly in 2013; they broke up in the same year.

Filmography

Film

Television

Stage

References

External links 

Living people
1993 births
21st-century English actresses
Actresses from Berkshire
English female models
People educated at St Mary's School, Ascot
People from Bracknell